Fantozzi – Il ritorno ("Fantozzi – The Return") is a 1996 Italian comedy film directed by Neri Parenti. It is the ninth chapter in the Fantozzi film series of the unlucky clerk Ugo Fantozzi, played by its creator, Paolo Villaggio.

Plot 
Due to the lack of free places in Paradise, an angel sends Fantozzi back on earth thanks to an agreement under which he will resume his life as if he had never died. On earth, Fantozzi will have to face the puberty of his nephew Ughina, a deep depression caused by his andropause, the false pregnancy of  Mrs. Silvani and a false accusation of corruption.

Cast 
 Paolo Villaggio as Ugo Fantozzi
 Milena Vukotic as  Pina Fantozzi
 Gigi Reder as  Filini
 Anna Mazzamauro as  Mrs. Silvani 
 Maria Cristina Maccà as  Mariangela Fantozzi / Uga Fantozzi
  Paolo Paoloni as Galactic Megadirector  Duke Count Balabam 
  Angelo Bernabucci as   Telecom Employee
 Maurizio Mattioli as Plastic Surgeon
 Antonio Allocca as  Train Inspector  
  Fabio Traversa as  Guardia di Finanza Agent
  Mauro Vestri as  Guardia di Finanza Agent
  Nello Riviè as Public Prosecutor 
  Gianni Franco as Police Commissioner
 Éva Henger as Chat-Line Announcer

References

External links

1996 comedy films
1996 films
Films directed by Neri Parenti
Films scored by Bruno Zambrini
Italian comedy films
1990s Italian films